Middleton Hall may refer to the following places in the United Kingdom:

Middleton Hall, Carmarthenshire, site of the National Botanic Garden of Wales
Middleton Hall, Cumbria, a listed building
Middleton Hall, Earle, a location in Northumberland
Middleton Hall, Middleton, Leeds
Middleton Hall, Middleton, Northumberland, a country house near Belford
Middleton Hall, Stoney Middleton, a restored 17th-century in Derbyshire
Middleton Hall, Warwickshire, a Grade II* listed building dating from medieval times
Middleton Hall exhibition space, Central Milton Keynes Shopping Centre, Buckinghamshire

See also
Middleton Hall Lakes, a nature reserve in Warwickshire, UK

Architectural disambiguation pages